

Babbacombe Cliff Railway, also known as the Babbacombe Cliff Lift, is a funicular railway in the town of Torquay in the English county of Devon. It links  Babbacombe Downs with Oddicombe Beach. The line runs every day, with a closure period in winter for maintenance. The first car runs at 09:30, and the last at 17:30. A bell is rung 30 and 15 minutes before closing.

History
In February 1923, the Torquay Tramway Company commissioned Waygood-Otis Ltd with the engineering and construction of the railway. Construction started in 1924, and the line was first opened on 1 April 1926. The line cost £15,648 to construct. The tramway company continued to work the line until 13 March 1935, when it was taken over by Torquay Borough Council. The line was closed in 1941, due to World War II security restrictions, and reopened in 1951 after modernisation by Messrs J & E Hall of Dartford. The railway underwent further refurbishment in 1993 and a three-year programme of renovation commenced in November 2005.

In July 2009, the ownership of the line was transferred from Torbay Council, who had inherited ownership from Torquay Borough Council as a result of local government reorganisation, to a specially created community interest company. In 2019, the CIC converted to become a Charitable Incorporated Organisation.

Specifications
 Two cars of traditional funicular design with a 40-person standing capacity
  track with a  gauge
 Rated speed of 
 Drive equipment located at the top station
 Direct current wattage drive system, incorporating servomotor-operated controller
 Hoisting ropes attached to upper ends of car chassis, supplemented by a compensating rope system to load balance for car position on track

Incidents
On 4 September 2022, An engineer from the railway was killed in what was described as an industrial accident.

See also
St Marychurch
List of funicular railways

References

External links

Official website
BBC News article about the railway
Brief description of railway with pictures

Funicular railways in the United Kingdom
Tourist attractions in Devon
Torquay
5 ft 8 in gauge railways in England
Industrial archaeological sites in Devon